Dalaca chiriquensis is a species of moth of the family Hepialidae. It is known from Panama.

References

External links
Hepialidae genera

Moths described in 1914
Hepialidae
Fauna of Panama